Phú Hội is a rural commune (xã) and village of the An Phú District of An Giang Province, Vietnam. It lies on the border with Cambodia.

Communes of An Giang province
Populated places in An Giang province